The Ambassador from Israel to Seychelles is Israel's foremost diplomatic representative in Seychelles.

List of ambassadors

Oded Joseph (Non-Resident, Nairobi) 2019 - 
Noah Gal Gendler (Non-Resident, Nairobi) 2017 - 2019
Jacob Keidar (Non-Resident, Nairobi) 2007 - 2011

References

Seychelles
Israel